The 2021–22 Moroccan Throne Cup was the 66th staging of the Moroccan Throne Cup, the main knockout football tournament in Morocco.

Preliminary round

Qualified teams
The following teams competed in the 2020–21 Moroccan Throne Cup Fourth round.

In addition to the 15 teams of 2021–22 Division National

Widad Temara
Ittifaq Marrakech
Wydad Serghini
Kenitra AC
Association Al Mansoria
COD Meknès
Olympique Youssoufia
Rachad Bernoussi
Chabab Mrirt
JS de Kasbah Tadla
US Témara
Fath Nador
Union Sidi Kacem
CSM Ouarzazate
Mouloudia Dakhla

11 teams of 2021–22 Amateur Division I

-North Group
Fath Casablanca
Tihad Sale
Fath Ouislane
Chabab Rif Al Hoceima
Difâa Hamrya de Khénifra

-South group
US Amal Tiznit
USM Ait Melloul
Chabab Houara
Mouloudia Assa
Jeunesse Sud Boujdour
Mouloudia Marrakech

4 teams of 2021–22 Amateur Division II

Union Boujaad (South group)
Wafa Wydad (Western North group)
Renaissance Zaio (Eastern North group)
Nejm Terfaya (Sahara Group)

2 teams of 2021–22 Amateur Division III

Chabab Alam Tanger (North League - Group B)
CODER Errachidia (Drâa-Tafilalet League)

Fourth round

The fourth round was played on 29–30 January 2023.

 North

|}

 South

|}

Round of 64
The Round of 64 (1/32) matches were played on 5–6 February 2023, the clubs who participed in this stage are the qualified teams from the previous round plus the sixteen club of 2021–22 Botola 2.

 North

|}

 South

|}

Final phase

Qualified teams

The following teams competed in the 2020–21 Moroccan Throne Cup.

16 teams of 2021-22 Botola

AS FAR
Chabab Mohammédia
Difaâ El Jadidi
FUS Rabat
Hassania Agadir
IR Tanger
Maghreb de Fès
OC Khouribga
Mouloudia Oujda
JS Soualem
Olympic Safi
Raja Casablanca
Rapide Oued Zem
RSB Berkane
Wydad Casablanca
Youssoufia Berrechid

10 teams of 2021-22 Botola 2

Moghreb Tetouan
Union de Touarga
Renaissance Zemamra
AS Sale
Stade Marocain
Ittihad Khemisset
Chabab Ben Guerir
Racing Casablanca
US Musulmane d'Oujda
Tihad Casablanca

2 teams of 2021–22 Division National

JS de Kasbah Tadla
 Fath Nador

4 teams of 2021–22 Amateur Division I

Fath Casablanca (North Group)
US Amal Tiznit (South group)
Chabab Houara (South group)
Jeunesse Sud Boujdour (South group)

Bracket
Draw of the 2021–22 Moroccan Throne Cup final phase

Round of 32
The Round of 32 (1/16) matches were played on 9–10, 16 February and 15 March 2023. the clubs who participed in this stage are the qualified teams from the previous round plus the sixteen club of 2021–22 Botola. 

 North

|}

 South

|}

Round of 16

The draw was held on 16 March 2023, the first team drawn played at home. A total of eight games were played on 26–27 March 2023.

|}

Quarter-finals

|}

Semi-finals
Semi-final matches will be played at a neutral venue.

|}

References

External links
Moroccan Throne Cup - 2022, Goalzz.com

Morocco
Coupe
Coupe